Timo Eichfuss (born 19 November 1988) is a former Estonian professional basketball player. He is a 2.00 m (6 ft 7 in) tall power forward. He represented the Estonian national basketball team internationally.

Club career
Timo Eichfuss started his basketball career in Rakvere Palliklubi and youth system and went on to make his debut in Korvpalli Meistriliiga at the age of 17 with the senior team. After three seasons with Rakvere Tarvas he signed with University of Tartu in 2008.

Awards and accomplishments

Professional career
University of Tartu
 2× Estonian League champion: 2010, 2015

Kalev/Cramo
Estonian League champion: 2017

References

External links
Timo Eichfuss at basket.ee 
Timo Eichfuss at fiba.com

1988 births
Living people
BC Kalev/Cramo players
BC Rakvere Tarvas players
BC Valga players
Estonian men's basketball players
KK Pärnu players
Korvpalli Meistriliiga players
People from Muhu Parish
Power forwards (basketball)
University of Tartu basketball team players